John Doyle (born 1992 in Carlow, Ireland) is an Irish sportsperson.  He plays hurling with O Loughlin Gaels  and has been a member of the Carlow senior inter-county team since 2011.

Playing career

Club

Doyle currently plays his hurling in Kilkenny with O Loughlin gaels. However, Doyle started playing his club hurling with Carlow Town.  After coming to prominence at underage levels he made his senior club championship debut as a fringe player in 2008.  He has since become a key member of the team's full-forward line. However, in 2011 he decided to switch clubs to O loughlin Gaels in Kilkenny.

Inter-county

Doyle first played for Carlow at inter-county level as a member of the county's minor hurling team in 2009.  That year Carlow qualified for the final of the Leinster Shield, however, they were defeated by Kildare.  Doyle was still a member of the Carlow minor hurling team in 2010, however, the teams provincial campaign came to an end in the quarter-finals.  He later joined the county's under-21 team.

Doyle made his senior championship debut in 2011 when he came on as a substitute in a defeat by Antrim in the All-Ireland qualifiers. 
In December 2011, Doyle was asked to play for Kilkenny seniors, however Doyle rejected the offer and decided to stick with Carlow.

References

1992 births
Living people
Carlow Town hurlers
Carlow inter-county hurlers